United States Navy rank insignia may refer to:

U.S. Navy enlisted rate insignia
U.S. Navy officer rank insignia